Grafschaft Hoya is a Samtgemeinde ("collective municipality") in the district of Nienburg, in Lower Saxony, Germany. Its seat is in the town Hoya. Its name refers to the medieval County of Hoya. On 1 January 2011, it merged with the former Samtgemeinde Eystrup.

The Samtgemeinde Grafschaft Hoya consists of the following municipalities:
 Bücken
 Eystrup
 Gandesbergen 
 Hämelhausen 
 Hassel
 Hilgermissen 
 Hoya
 Hoyerhagen 
 Schweringen 
 Warpe

Samtgemeinden in Lower Saxony